North Limited was a diversified mining and resources company. Although based in Australia, its operations eventually extended to six continents. By the late 20th century the company had become the fourth largest iron ore exporter in the world with expansion underway which would have made it equal third. Its biggest asset was a majority stake in Robe River, a major miner of the Pilbara iron ore deposits of Western Australia and the world's lowest cost producer of iron ore.

History
The company was formed in 1888 as North Broken Hill Silver Mining to exploit the rich silver, lead and zinc deposits at Broken Hill in western New South Wales, the name was shortened to North Broken Hill in 1905. Production at the original North Broken Hill mine wound down and it finally closed in 1993.

However over the years the company had diversified into other mining provinces. In 1988 they took over Peko-Wallsend, changing its name to North Broken Hill Peko Limited, then North Limited in 1994. At Broken Hill the company had been known as 'North' to distinguish it from other miners in the area such as Broken Hill South and The Broken Hill Proprietary. The nickname continued long after the company's focus had moved away from Broken Hill, so the new name just formalized what the company had always been known as.

By 2000, while North was a widely diversified resource company, iron ore assets represented 44% of its value and investing to begin production at the new West Angelas iron ore mine in the Pilbara was the company's major focus. However money had also been committed to increase production at the Iron Ore Company of Canada and the Northparkes copper and gold mine..

Takeover
Like its peer Western Mining, North developed into a large diversified resources company with one special world class asset that attracted attention from huge mining companies across the world. In the case of Western Mining it was the Olympic Dam copper, gold and uranium deposit, for North it was Robe River Iron.

In 2000 a bidding war for North broke out when Rio Tinto launched a hostile takeover at $3.80 a share. This was topped by an Anglo American bid of $4.20, Rio Tinto responded with a successful offer of $4.75 per share. The company was delisted and after the takeover, Rio Tinto integrated most of North's assets into its own operations, but sold others such as the Northparkes.

Assets
In 2000 when it was taken over, North's major assets were:
Robe River Iron Associates. A large, low cost iron ore miner in the Pilbara, Western Australia, 53% interest
Iron Ore Company of Canada, an iron ore miner in Labrador, 56.1% interest
Zinkgruvan, a zinc miner in Sweden, 100% ownership
Energy Resources of Australia, a uranium producer in the Northern Territory, 68.4% interest
Northparkes copper and gold mine in New South Wales, 80% interest
Alumbrera a large copper and gold producer in Argentina, 25% interest
North Forest Products. Tasmanian producer of plantation woodchips (3.3. million tons annually, and 43% of Australian exports) 100% ownership
Golden Valley Joint Venture, Kanowna Belle Gold Mine, 50% interest
Peak Hill Joint Venture gold mine, 33.33% interest
The company was also exploring resource deposits in Australia, Indonesia, Ivory Coast, Peru, Mexico and the United States

Previously North had owned many mines and companies. Some of them were:
North Broken Hill silver lead and zinc mine
Warman slurry pumps
Former Peko zinc assets, mostly those acquired from EZ Industries, Tasmania that were merged with Rio Tinto assets and spun off to form Pasminco in 1988

References

Companies based in Melbourne
Companies formerly listed on the Australian Securities Exchange
Defunct mining companies of Australia
Former Rio Tinto (corporation) subsidiaries
Gold mining companies of Australia
History of mining
Iron ore mining companies of Australia
Non-renewable resource companies established in 1885
Uranium mining companies of Australia
Australian companies established in 1885
Non-renewable resource companies disestablished in 2000
Australian companies disestablished in 2000